is a railway station in the city of Goshogawara, Aomori, Japan, operated by the private railway operator Tsugaru Railway Company.

Lines

Station layout
The station has a single ground-level side platform serving a bidirectional track. The station is unattended.

History
Ashino-Kōen Station was opened on October 4, 1930. The station building was replaced in 1975. The original station building, a one-story wooden structure with a copper roof and pentagonal gable which appeared in Osamu Dazai's novel "Tsugaru", was preserved and used as a coffee shop by the NPO "Kanagi Genki Club" and as the "Tsugaru Railway Old Ashinokoen Station Bookstore". It received protection as a Registered Tangible Cultural Property in 2014.  It is the last remaining building on the Tsugaru Railway from the time of its opening

Surrounding area
 Ashino Chishōgun Prefectural Natural Park

See also
 List of railway stations in Japan

References

External links

 

Railway stations in Aomori Prefecture
Tsugaru Railway Line
Goshogawara
Railway stations in Japan opened in 1930
Registered Tangible Cultural Properties